Thaumatopsis pexellus, the woolly grass-veneer, is a moth in the family Crambidae. It was described by Philipp Christoph Zeller in 1863. It is found in most of North America. The habitat consists of grasslands.

The wingspan is 21–32 mm. The forewings are yellowish grey  with a whitish line, the outer half bounded above by a thicker dark brown line. There is a terminal row of three to five dark dots. Adults are on wing from July to early September in most of the range.

The larvae feed on various grasses.

Subspecies
Thaumatopsis pexellus pexellus
Thaumatopsis pexellus coloradella Kearfott, 1908 (Colorado, California, Alberta)
Thaumatopsis pexellus gibsonella Kearfott, 1908
Thaumatopsis pexellus strictalis (Dyar, 1914) (Mexico)

References

Crambini
Moths described in 1863
Moths of North America